
Gmina Kobylin is an urban-rural gmina (administrative district) in Krotoszyn County, Greater Poland Voivodeship, in west-central Poland.

Villages
Apart from the town of Kobylin, Gmina Kobylin contains the villages and settlements of Berdychów, Długołęka, Fijałów, Górka, Kuklinów, Łagiewniki, Nepomucenów, Raszewy, Rębiechów, Rojew, Rzemiechów, Smolice, Sroki, Starkowiec, Stary Kobylin, Starygród, Targoszyce, Wyganów, Zalesie Małe, Zalesie Wielkie and Zdziętawy.

Neighbouring gminas
Gmina Kobylin is bordered by the gminas of Jutrosin, Koźmin Wielkopolski, Krotoszyn, Pępowo, Pogorzela and Zduny.

References
Polish official population figures 2006

Kobylin
Krotoszyn County